Thomas Olan Rogers (born June 11, 1987), is an American comedian, actor, filmmaker, and YouTuber. He is the creator of the animated television series Final Space as well as the voice of Gary Goodspeed, Mooncake, and various others.

Rogers started his career on YouTube alongside two Collierville High School and University of Memphis friends in the comedy trio BalloonShop, known for their comedic sketches and shorts. After transitioning to his solo channel, Rogers uploaded videos of his own sketches as well as humorous stories of his life, short films, and even several animated shorts.

In 2015, after lamenting his inability to meet with fans as often as he liked, Rogers opened a lounge called "The Soda Parlor" in Nashville, which offered arcade games and various desserts. The Parlor was later hit by a tornado in March 2020, and then looted in the aftermath.

In 2016, he created a pilot that became the animated television show, Final Space. The series followed a rogue astronaut named Gary, and his sidekick, a planet-destroying alien named Mooncake, both of whom Rogers voiced. 10 episodes were released between February and April 2018 on TBS. The series was later added to Netflix overseas. A second season was released in 2019 on Adult Swim. Season 3 premiered on March 20, 2021. Rogers ran the social media accounts for the show, including the official Twitter account, calling it a "good opportunity" to connect with fans. In September 2022, Rogers revealed that Final Space would be leaving Netflix internationally in 2023, as part of a group of properties being written off by Warner Bros. Discovery for tax purposes. Due to this, Season 3 would not be receiving physical copies, and all mention of the show would be erased from the platform. Nevertheless, Olan promised that he would continue fighting for the show to get a proper ending, under the hashtag "#renewfinalspace", and revealed shirts he had printed with the text "FINAL SPACE" and "TAX WRITE-OFF", to raise awareness of its situation.

His channel reached 1,000,000 subscribers on March 26, 2019, but entered long periods of inactivity, which Olan later explained was a result of coming to terms with numerous personal troubles, including the destruction of the Parlor, and the death of his cat, Starscream. 

In June 2022, Rogers uploaded a trailer for his next project, an animation titled Godspeed, turning to Kickstarter to help fund it. The campaign was funded in just two hours, hitting 580% of its original goal. The official Godspeed website later clarified that after various fees and cuts, the KS money could fund about 8-9 minutes of animation, so it would be a short instead. This was followed up with an upload on November 18th, discussing that while waiting for various shows he had pitched to start production, he had found a renewed passion for creating content outside of television or animation, after returning temporarily to Tennessee.

Filmography

Feature films

Other Media

Video games

References list

External links
 

1987 births
American cartoonists
American actors
American YouTubers
Living people
People from Nashville, Tennessee
People from Collierville, Tennessee